Kamenica nad Cirochou is a village and municipality in Humenné District in the Prešov Region of north-east Slovakia. By number of citizens it is the biggest village in the District. There are two rivers Cirocha and Kamenica that merge approximately 1 km off the village. There are 23 named streets with public lighting.

History
Original site of village was significantly closer to Cirocha river. Change was induced probably by regular floods.

In historical records the village was first mentioned in 1317. King Robert I. gave it, together with other villages and town of Humenné, as a reward for faithful service to Drugeth family. It is assumed that village is older than with estimated origin in 13. century.

First known name of the village was Kemence and from 1416 it is called in official records Nagy Kemence. Mansion located in the village was built by Csáky family. Later it was owned by Andrássy family and Gejza Andrassy was the last count that lived in the mansion. In 1925 he sold part of land to citizens which lead to village expansion. In 1933 state took over management of woods and fields from the same count. With this change is linked origin of Military forests in the area and building electric sawmill.

Demographic evolution 

Source: Statistical office of the Slovak republic

Geography
The municipality lies at an altitude of 179 metres and covers an area of 17.573 km².
It has a population of about 2340 people.

Airports 

 Humenne-Kamenica Airport - Main airport of the Humenné District, Humenne-Kamenica Airport is located here.

Sights
 Classicist mansion from 1773 (at the moment closed to the public).
 Church of St. Stephen from 1782.

References

External links
 
 
http://www.kamenicanadcirochou.sk/

Villages and municipalities in Humenné District